Home Before Dark is a 1958 Warner Brothers dark drama film, directed and produced by Mervyn LeRoy, and starring Jean Simmons, Dan O'Herlihy, Rhonda Fleming, and Efrem Zimbalist Jr. The screenplay was written by Eileen and Robert Bassing, based on the novel by Eileen Bassing. The title song was written by Sammy Cahn with music by Jimmy McHugh.

The film, and Simmons' performance in particular, attracted positive critical comment. Pauline Kael of the New Yorker wrote, "Jean Simmons gives a reserved, beautifully modulated performance," and film critic Philip French believed it contained "perhaps her finest performance."

Plot
Charlotte Bronn (Jean Simmons) leaves a Massachusetts state mental hospital to resume life with her professor husband, Arnold Bronn (Dan O'Herlihy) after a year inside. Dr. Collins worries  that Charlotte will be among the many patients who relapse when they return to the same situations that caused their problems. Charlotte's stepmother, Inez (Mabel Albertson) and stepsister, Joan (Rhonda Fleming) live with them in the house Charlotte owns. Charlotte knows she attacked Joan in a fit of jealousy but has no memory of it. She knows because she was told. There is also a stranger in the house, a boarder, Dr. Jake Diamond (Efrem Zimbalist, Jr.), on temporary assignment at the college where Arnold teaches. He offered the room to be hospitable—and to please the soon-to-retire department head. Arnold wants his job. Mattie, the irascible cook, completes the household.

Arnold sees no reason to change things.

At breakfast, Inez bosses her mercilessly, issuing commands about everything from the food she eats to a new wardrobe. Arnold has been sleeping on the couch in his library. When Charlotte begs him to come back to their room, he lies, telling her that Dr. Collins says she should stay alone for a while. Bewildered, she asks, “How could love hurt me?” Charlotte struggles to adjust, but “can't get well in a vacuum”.  Arnold observes that she has changed since they married. She used to enjoy faculty functions….

The flashback to a student-faculty dance reveals that Charlotte is actually a brunette. Hamilton “Ham” Gregory (Steve Dunne), who loves her, declares that she “hasn't been herself for weeks.” She's acting like her sister, “big personality, batting eyes, calling everybody ‘Ducky,'” She replies that Professor Bronn, who likes the way she calls him Ducky, will propose to her before the party ends.

Arnold says he is attracted by her “youth, quick mind, gaiety, and her free way of meeting life”. “I am not those things” she demurs. Arnold confesses: “I don't know how to show emotion. I cannot remember crying, even as a child.” But he felt jealous, seeing her with Ham. He is trying to tell her he loves her. They kiss, and we return to the present.

Inez and Charlotte meet Inez' friend in Boston and encounter Ham. Charlotte and Ham talk over lunch. He makes a drunken pass at her and asks if she is sure she was wrong about her sister and husband,  Charlotte's old friend Cathy Bergner (Joanna Barnes), whose unfaithful spouse has confessed, asks Charlotte for advice, thinking she has experience.   Charlotte walks to the college to demand a straight answer from Arnold, who tells her she is relapsing.  She promises the family doctor to be good, afraid of being committed.

Arnold agrees to take Charlotte to Boston for Christmas. Jake suggests that she see a psychiatrist, as she once planned. In Boston, Arnold lies to his friends, forestalling their meeting Charlotte. At lunch, Charlotte asks Ham, who has stopped drinking, for help regaining control of her finances. When she tells him Arnold is drugging her food, he asks her to see a psychiatrist, a good man. She leaves.

After a manic shopping spree, she has her hair styled exactly like Joan's and buys a gold lamé evening dress, 5 sizes too big, It is falling off her when she joins Arnold and his friends in the dining room, introducing herself as “Joan”.

In the hotel room, Arnold weeps. She asks why. She does not remember, and wants all the truth. He does not admit infidelity, but he finally does say, “I do not love you.” They agree to divorce.

At the big New Year's party, Charlotte “looks like herself” again, Joan is a hit in the gold dress, and Arnold obsesses about appearances. Charlotte walks out, telling him to “go to hell.”

She fires Mattie and confronts the family, telling Arnold that he married an imitation of Joan. She calls Jake and asks him to drive her to Boston. She calls Ham and asks him to arrange an appointment with the psychiatrist, “today”.  She tells Arnold that they must vacate the house after the semester break. Jake drives her away into a wintry dawn.

Cast

 Jean Simmons as Charlotte Bronn
 Dan O'Herlihy as Arnold Bronn
 Rhonda Fleming as Joan Carlisle
 Efrem Zimbalist Jr. as Jacob "Jake" Diamond
 Mabel Albertson as Inez Winthrop
 Steve Dunne as Hamilton Gregory
 Joanna Barnes as Frances Barrett
 Joan Weldon as Cathy Bergner
 Kathryn Card as Mattie
 Marjorie Bennett as Hazel Evans
 Eleanor Audley as Mrs. Hathaway
 Johnstone White as Malcolm Southey

Reception
When Bosley Crowther reviewed the film in the November 11, 1958, issue of The New York Times, he praised Simmons' portrayal of Charlotte Bronn, but little else: “For more than two hours, this hapless creature, whom the lovely Miss Simmons plays with a great deal more passion and sincerity than the hollow script justifies, tears her poor self to tatters in a situation that is slightly absurd, not only in its psychological pretense but also in the stilted way it is staged. Fetched home from a mental hospital by her curiously chilly spouse, … she finds herself once more confronted with the same circumstances that impelled her into the asylum in the first place. If anything, they are worse. …Miss Simmons thrashes around in this unnatural situation, stifling her love and jealousy, backing away from the temptatious boarder and getting progressively worse. Finally, after she has jumped her trolley and made an embarrassing scene in a Boston hotel, she asks the questions that have been obvious to any adult all along: "Why haven't I been taken to a psychiatrist?"—and, to her husband, "Do you love me?" He answers "No."That's about it. … the direction of Mr. LeRoy contributes to the thinness of the drama. While he has over-elaborated his sets, he has underelaborated his characters with the graphic glints that might make them meaningful….Happily, we are spared one superfluity…"Home Before Dark" is filmed appropriately in plain old-fashioned black and white.”

Variety staff wrote: “Home before Dark should give the Kleenex a vigorous workout. … it is a romantic melodrama of considerable power and imprint. The screenplay… sometimes seems rather skimpy in its character motivation. It is also difficult at times to understand the mental tone of the mentally ill heroine (Jean Simmons). But while the tale is unfolding it is made so gripping that factual discrepancies are relatively unimportant. (Simmons') stepmother (Mabel Albertson) and her stepsister (Rhonda Fleming)… are masterful females who could drive anyone to the edge of madness. Her only real ally in the house is a stranger (Efrem Zimbalist Jr), who is also an alien in the setting of the inbred New England college community…The whole picture is seen from Simmons’ viewpoint, which means she is ‘on’ virtually the whole time. Her voice is a vibrant instrument, used with thoughtful articulation and placement, the only vital part of her at times. Joseph Biroc’s photography is suited to the grim New England atmosphere. It is winter, a depressingly gray winter, and the locations in Massachusetts give the picture the authentic feel.”

Award nominations
The film was nominated for three Golden Globe awards: Jean Simmons for Best Actress (drama), Best Picture (drama), and Zimbalist for Best Supporting Actor.

Home media
Home Before Dark was released to DVD by Warner Home Video on July 8, 2011 via its Warner Archive MOD DVD service.

See also
 List of American films of 1958

References

External links
 
 
 Home Before Dark at Turner Classic Movies
 

1958 films
1958 drama films
Adultery in films
American black-and-white films
American drama films
Films about depression
Films based on American novels
Films directed by Mervyn LeRoy
Films scored by Ray Heindorf
Films set in Boston
Films set in Massachusetts
Films shot in Boston
Films shot in Massachusetts
Warner Bros. films
1950s English-language films
1950s American films